Widow's Might or The Widow's Might may refer to:
 Widow's Might, a 1935 British comedy film
 The Widow's Might (1918 film), a lost American silent comedy film
 The Widow's Might, a 2009 American drama film

See also 
 Lesson of the widow's mite
 Widow's Mite, an estate in the U.S.